Fedir Koriatovych also spelled Theodor Koriatovits (died 1414 in Mukachevo) was a Podolian prince from a Ruthenian branch of the Gediminids dynasty in what is now Ukraine. Son of Karijotas. 

Fedir inherited Navahrudak Castle from his father. After Grand Duchy of Lithuania gained Podolia as a result of the decisive victory against the Golden Horde at the Battle of Blue Waters in 1362, he with his three brothers were appointed by Grand Duke Algirdas to administrate the region. After the last of his brothers died circa 1389, he remained the sole administrator of Podolia for three years until his exile by the Grand Duke Vytautas the Great.

In 1392 he disobeyed Vytautas the Great and was forced into exile. In 1396, Koriatovych purchased the city of Munkács in the Kingdom of Hungary (today Mukachevo, Ukraine), settling himself in the city's Palanok Castle, which would become one of the most protected castles in the region.

References

 Шабульдо Ф. М. Федір Коріятович // NASU Institute of History of Ukraine
 Kuczyński S. M. Fedor Koriatowicz (†przed 1416) // Polski Słownik Biograficzny. — Kraków : Polska Akademia Umiejętności, 1947. — T. VI/4, zeszyt 29. — S. 383—384.

External links
 Koryatovich NASU Institute of History of Ukraine
 varvar.ru — Kniaz Fedor Koryatovych (Teodor Koryatovych)

1414 deaths
Gediminids
People from Mukachevo
Date of birth unknown